Henrietta Knight may refer to:

Henrietta Knight (racehorse trainer) (born 1946), English racehorse trainer
Henrietta Knight, Lady Luxborough (1699–1756), British poet